John H. Watson (May 12, 1851 – December 7, 1929) was a Vermont attorney and judge.  He served as an associate justice of the Vermont Supreme Court from 1899 to 1917, and chief justice from 1917 to 1929.

Biography
John Henry Watson was born in Jamaica, Vermont on May 12, 1851, the son of Asahel W. Watson and Adelphia (Jackson) Watson.  He was raised and educated in Bradford, Vermont, and attended several academies, including the Vermont Methodist Seminary in Montpelier.  He studied law in the office of attorney Orin Gambell of Bradford, attained admission to the bar in 1877, and practiced in Bradford.

Start of career
In addition to practicing law, Watson became active in the Vermont National Guard; after initially serving as a lieutenant, in 1882 he was elected commander of a company called the Bradford Guards and promoted to captain.  When the Bradford area's 1883 Ely Copper Mine strike turned violent, Watson's company was employed to restore order, and was credited with ending the fighting by capturing the rioters' gunpowder and weapons.  He was later promoted to major as commander of 1st Battalion, 1st Vermont Infantry Regiment, and in 1895 he received promotion to lieutenant colonel.  In 1898, Watson was elected to serve as commander of the 1st Vermont Infantry Regiment with the rank of colonel, but declined the position, which closed his military career.

A Republican, Watson served as State's Attorney of Orange County from 1886 to 1888, and was a member of the Vermont Senate from 1892 to 1894.  He was a member of the board of directors of the Bradford Savings Bank and Trust Company, and a member of the Bradford Academy Board of Trustees.

Career as a judge
In 1899, Jonathan Ross resigned as chief justice of the Vermont Supreme Court in order to accept appointment as a United States Senator.  Associate Justice Russell S. Taft was promoted to chief justice, and Watson was appointed as an associate justice to fill the vacancy created by Taft's advancement.  Watson served as an associate justice until 1917, when he succeeded Loveland Munson as chief justice, and was succeeded as an associate justice by Willard W. Miles.  He served as chief justice until his death, and was succeeded by George M. Powers.

Death and burial
Watson became a resident of Montpelier after joining the Supreme Court.  He died at his Montpelier home on December 7, 1929, and was buried at Green Mount Cemetery in Montpelier.

Family
In 1879, Watson married Clara Laurette Hammond a schoolteacher of Wardsboro, Vermont who graduated from the Vermont Normal School in Randolph and taught school before their wedding.  They were the parents of two sons, John H. Watson Jr. (1883-1962), and Hugh Hammond Watson (1885-1947).

John H. Watson Jr. was a prominent attorney in Cleveland, Ohio.  Hugh W. Watson was a career diplomat with the U.S. State Department whose postings included vice consul, deputy consul, and consul postings in: Three Rivers, Quebec; Yarmouth, Nova Scotia; Belfast, Ireland; Liverpool, England; Lyon, France; and Glasgow, Scotland.

References

Sources

Newspapers

Books

Magazines

1851 births
1929 deaths
People from Jamaica, Vermont
People from Bradford, Vermont
People from Montpelier, Vermont
Vermont lawyers
U.S. state supreme court judges admitted to the practice of law by reading law
Republican Party Vermont state senators
Justices of the Vermont Supreme Court
National Guard (United States) officers
Burials at Green Mount Cemetery (Montpelier, Vermont)
Vermont National Guard personnel
19th-century American lawyers